Psychopath Diary is a 2019 South Korean television series starring Yoon Shi-yoon, Jung In-sun and Park Sung-hoon. It aired on tvN from November 20, 2019 to January 9, 2020.

Synopsis
Yook Dong-sik (Yoon Shi-yoon), an analyst who works at Daehan Securities, has a timid personality and he can't even get angry at the people who look down upon him. One day, shortly after failing on his attempt of suicide, he witnesses a murder. He unintentionally picks up a diary belonging to murderer, on which was written the log of his murders. He flees with the diary, but he is accidentally hit by Police Officer Shim Bo-kyung's (Jung In-sun) patrol car which causes him to suffer from retrograde amnesia. Due to the diary in his possession, Dong-sik mistakenly believes he is a psychopath. Since that moment, his behavior started to change. Bo-kyung, who got involved with Dong-sik, decides to catch the serial killer.

Meanwhile, Seo In-woo (Park Sung-hoon), the director and son of the chairman of Daehan Securities where Dong-sik works, turns out to be the heartless psychopath serial killer. He loses his diary when his 6th victim, a homeless old man tossed his diary away. He feels insecure ever since.

Cast

Main
 Yoon Shi-yoon as Yook Dong-sik, a timid and pushover man who works as a clerk at Daehan Securities. His weak personality begins to change when he perceive himself as a killer.
 Jung In-sun as Shim Bo-kyung, an officer in a patrol station.
 Park Sung-hoon as Seo In-woo, the real psychopathic serial killer who is also the director of Daehan Securities where Dong-sik works at.

Supporting

People around Yook Dong-sik 
 Lee Han-wi as Yook Jong-chul, Dong-sik's father.
 Hwang Geum-byul as Yook Ji-yeon, Dong-sik's older sister.
 Kim Gyul as Jo Yong-gu, Dong-sik's brother-in-law.
 Jung Su-bin as Yook Dong-chan, Dong-sik's younger half-brother.
 So Hee-jung as Na In-hye, Dong-sik's step-mother, Dong-chan's mother.
 Heo Sung-tae as Jang Chil-sung, a gangster who lives at Unit 708. He later addresses Dong-sik as his 'Big Boss' after mistakenly believes him to be a serial killer.

People around Shim Bo-kyung 
 Choi Sung-won as Heo Taek-soo, Bo-kyung partner.
 Kim Myung-soo as Shim Seok-gu, Bo-kyung's father who is a former investigator police.
 Lee Kan-hee as Lee Suk-yeon, Bo-kyung's mother.
 Lee Hae-young as Officer Ryu Jae-joon

People around Seo In-woo 
 Park Jung-hak as Seo Chung-hyeon, In-woo's father who is the chairman of Daehan Securities.
 Yoo Bi as Seo Ji-hun, In-woo's step-brother and managing director of Daehan Securities.
 Yoon Ye-hee as Kim Eun-shil, Chung-hyeon's wife and Ji-hun's mother.
 Kim Hye-na as Seo Ji-eun, In-woo's step-sister.
 Lim Il-gyu as Kim Chan-il, In-woo's brother-in-law.
 Han Soo-hyun as Kim Mu-seok, former detective who now works for In-woo.

People at Daehan Securities 
 Choi Dae-chul as Gong Chan-seok, the manager of Team 3 and Dong-sik's boss who is selfish and rude.
 Kim Ki-doo as Park Jae-ho, Dong-shik's cunning team member who claims to be his best friend.
 Jo Shi-nae as Han Jung-ah, Dong-sik's colleague.
 Lee Min-ji as Oh Min-joo
 Choi Tae-hwan as Shin Seok-hyun
 Hwang Sun-hee as Jo Yoo-jin

Others 
 Gu Ja-geon as a bully

Special appearances 
 Jung Hae-kyun as Kim Myung-gook, a homeless man. ( 1–2)
 Yura as a girl with a dog in park (Ep. 2)
 Nam Jung-hee as murder victim (Ep. 2)
 Jo Yoon Ho as Chil-sung's junior (Ep. 2)
 Han Ji-eun as a woman with a big guy (Ep. 2)
 Yoon Ji-on as Joo Young-min (Ep. 4–5)
 Lee Hyun-woong as Oh Myung-dal (Ep. 12–13, 16)

Production
The first script reading was held in August 2019 in Sangam-dong, Seoul.

Original soundtrack

Part 1

Part 2

Viewership

References

External links
  
 
 

TVN (South Korean TV channel) television dramas
Korean-language television shows
2019 South Korean television series debuts
2020 South Korean television series endings
Television series by Studio Dragon
Television series by KeyEast
South Korean comedy television series
South Korean thriller television series